Potash and Perlmutter is a 1923 American silent comedy film directed by Clarence G. Badger. The film is based on an ethnic Jewish comedy with characters created by Montague Glass and Charles Klein for a 1913 Broadway play of the same name which ran for 441 performances. The play is based on the 1909 book of the same name by Montague Glass. This film is notable as the first release of Samuel Goldwyn's independent production company.

Stage stars Alexander Carr and Barney Bernard reprise their famous roles from the play in this film.

The film's success would inspire two Goldwyn sequels, In Hollywood with Potash and Perlmutter (1924) and Partners Again (1926). In 1927, the UK division of Phonofilm produced a short film with Augustus Yorke (1860-1939) and Nicholas Adams playing Potash and Perlmutter.

Cast 
 Alexander Carr as Morris Perlmutter
 Barney Bernard as Abe Potash
 Vera Gordon as Rosie Potash
 Martha Mansfield as The Head Model
 Ben Lyon as Boris Andrieff
 Edouard Durand as Feldman
 Hope Sutherland as Irma Potash
 De Sacia Mooers as Ruth Goldman
 Jerry Devine as The Office Boy
 Lee Kohlmar as Pasinsky
 Leo Donnelly as The Wide-Awake Salesman

References

External links

1923 films
American silent feature films
American black-and-white films
Samuel Goldwyn Productions films
Films directed by Clarence G. Badger
1923 comedy films
Silent American comedy films
First National Pictures films
1920s American films